Leucopogon cuneifolius is a species of flowering plant in the heath family Ericaceae and is endemic to Western Australia. Up to 3 flowers are borne in upper leaf axils on a short peduncle, with small bracts and bracteoles at the base.

This species was first formally described in 1859 by Sergei Sergeyevich Sheglejev in the Bulletin de la Société impériale des naturalistes de Moscou.
The specific epithet (cuneifolius) means "wedge-leaved".

Leucopogon cuneifolius (as Styphelia lissanthoides) occurs in the Avon Wheatbelt, Coolgardie, Esperance Plains and Mallee bioregions of south-western Western Australia and is listed "not threatened" by the Government of Western Australia Department of Biodiversity, Conservation and Attractions.

References

cuneifolius
Ericales of Australia
Flora of Western Australia
Plants described in 1859